Line Creek is a stream in the U.S. state of South Dakota.

Line Creek received its name from the fact it flows near the border (line) of the Cheyenne River Indian Reservation.

See also
List of rivers of South Dakota

References

Rivers of Perkins County, South Dakota
Rivers of South Dakota